Wir wollen nur deine Seele ("We only want your soul") is the second live album by German rock band Die Ärzte, released on 22 November 1999. It is a compilation of songs from different concerts. Leftover songs were released on Satanische Pferde, which was only available for fan club members.

The album's title is taken from a German book which was released by a Christian publisher in 1984 about the (perceived) propagation of satanism and occultism by rock musicians. This book gained a kind of cult status as a piece of real-life satire among heavy metal fans.

The subtitle of the first disc is a reference to Motörhead's successful live album No Sleep 'til Hammersmith and it also puns the heavy metal umlaut, for which Motörhead is a noted example.

"Sprüche II" on the EP contains two parts played at the same time, which means that one has to unplug the right speaker, when one wants to hear part 1 (left) and the other way around.

In December 1999, a sequel to the third disc, "Invasion der Vernunft II", was released on Die Ärzte's homepage for downloading in 24 parts, similar to an Advent calendar.

Track listing

6-LP vinyl version

Personnel
Farin Urlaub - guitar, vocals
Bela Felsenheimer - drums, vocals
Rodrigo González - bass guitar, vocals

Die Ärzte live albums
1999 live albums
German-language live albums